Robert E. Cornegy Jr. (born September 24, 1965) is an American politician. He is a former New York City Council Member for the 36th district, representing Bedford-Stuyvesant and northern Crown Heights in Brooklyn.

A Democrat, he was an unsuccessful candidate for Brooklyn Borough President in 2021.

Early life, education and early career
Cornegy is a native of New York City. He is the son of the late Dr. Robert E. Cornegy, Sr., pastor of Mount Calvary Baptist Church in Bedford-Stuyvesant, and Ellen J. Cornegy, the First Lady of Mount Calvary Baptist Church.

He played center for Andrew Jackson High School and was recruited by both Temple University and Syracuse University before playing backup center for St. John's University's 1984-85 Final Four team. Cornegy would later graduate from Mercy College in Dobbs Ferry, New York, with a bachelor's degree in Organizational Management. He played professional basketball in both Israel and Turkey.

Following his basketball career, he earned a master's degree in Organizational Management from Mercy College. He returned to Bedford-Stuyvesant and with an increased awareness of the mental health issues and drug use in the community became a Credentialed Alcoholism and Substance Abuse Counselor (CASAC). He later opened the Cornegy Residence treatment center for chemically dependent men in Bedford-Stuyvesant.

New York City Council
In 2009, Cornegy made his first run at the 36th district, but lost the primary election to incumbent Albert Vann. Four years later, he was elected to the same district after defeating Kirsten John Foy for the Democratic nomination in a close race. He won the general election easily on November 5, 2013.

In 2017, Cornegy was reelected to his Council seat. He is Chair of the Council's Committee on Housing and Buildings, Chair of the Minority- and Women-Owned Business Enterprise Task Force (M/WBEs), and a member of the Budget Negotiating Team (BNT). He is also a member of the Committees on Economic Development; Education; Finance; State & Federal Legislation; and Rules, Privileges, and Elections.

In 2017, Cornegy also ran to become the first black Speaker of the New York City Council and was named Democratic Conference Chair of the New York City Council in 2018.

Legislation 
In his first term, Cornegy was among the top 10 percent of sponsored legislation. Bills and initiatives of which he has led, sponsored or authored include:

 A lactation bill, mandating there be dedicated rooms for nursing and breast-feeding mothers in public buildings throughout the five boroughs
 The Kalief Browder Bill, calling for the Department of Corrections to provide vocational and educational programming, therapy and services to those detained or incarcerated on Rikers Island for longer than 10 days
 Commercial tenant anti-harassment and neglect legislation, offering protection against criminal landlords by creating a private right of action for commercial tenants facing harassment, and allocating $3.6 million to cover the legal costs associated with fighting unscrupulous property owners
 Senior Citizen Rent Increase Exemption (SCRIE) and the Disabled Rent Increase Exemption (DRIE), which is part of the Rent Freeze Program, an effort to increase affordable housing in NYC
 Workforce Disclosure Bill that requires certain contractors working on city-funded projects to disclose records on the nature of their workforce, including the certification of the contractor as a minority-owned or women-owned business enterprise

Cornegy also sponsored the bill to co-name the block of Stuyvesant Avenue between Lexington Avenue and Quincy Street, "Do the Right Thing Way" after the iconic 1989 movie Spike Lee directed, shot on that block. It was the first time a New York City street was named for a work of art, rather than a person or institution. Lee contributed to Cornegy's run for Brooklyn Borough President.

Other activities 
In 2012, Cornegy served as a delegate to President Obama at the Democratic National Convention. That same year, he also became District Leader / State Committeeman for the 56th Assembly District and was part of the Taskforce to Combat Gun Violence, delivering recommendations to reduce gun violence in NYC to the NYC Council Speaker.

In 2013, he partnered with Attorney General Eric Schneiderman to invest $20 million in funding the Homeowner Protection Program (HOPP) and launch the Foreclosure Rescue Scam Protection Initiative.

In 2014, Cornegy developed the Chamber on the Go program in partnership with the Brooklyn Chamber of Commerce to provide mobile support services to small businesses.

Cornegy supported the establishment of The Age Friendly Neighborhood (AFN) Initiative to improve the quality of life of older adults through advocacy, programming and access to essential resources.

While Chair of the Committee on Small Business, Cornegy co-led research on the state of the retail economy in NYC and delivered strategies to address retail challenges faced in underserved neighborhoods.

Cornegy was selected as a 2017-18 MIT CoLab Mel King Community Fellow alongside other social justice leaders.

Election history

Personal life 
Cornegy and his wife, Michelle, have a blended family of six children and live in Bedford Stuyvesant. A member of Omega Psi Phi, he has been noted for his seven-foot frame and long dreadlocks that are wrapped into a bun.

At 6 ft 10 in (2.08m), Cornegy was the tallest member of the New York City Council. From March 2019 to October 2019, Cornegy was the Guinness World Records holder for the World's Tallest Politician, but this title has since been conferred upon North Dakota Insurance Commissioner Jon Godfread, who is just over one centimeter taller.

References

External links
The New York City Council: Councilman Robert E. Cornegy Jr. (official site)
@RobertCornegyJr (official twitter)
Council Member Robert Cornegy on Facebook

African-American New York City Council members
Candidates in the 2021 United States elections
Living people
New York City Council members
New York (state) Democrats
Place of birth missing (living people)
St. John's Red Storm men's basketball players
University of Alabama alumni
21st-century American politicians
Mercy College (New York) alumni
Basketball players from New York City
1965 births
21st-century African-American politicians
20th-century African-American people